Fighter Maker  is a series of games for PlayStation consoles and Microsoft Windows. It features a robust character creation system, letting players even create animations.  There are two versions of the games, Fighter Maker (FM series) and 2D Fighter Maker (2DFM series).

Games

3D series

Fighter Maker

Part of Agetec Inc.'s Designer Series, Fighter Maker is 3D-based and allows users to create custom moves for their fighters.

The music for the game was composed by the U.K. band INTELLIGENTSIA, who also created the in-game FX; MIRAI, one of the band's 2 members, is a playable character in the game.

The Japanese edition of the first FM game is also known for having one licensed character, Street Fighter EXs Skullomania, complete with the original move list.

Reception

The game received average reviews according to the review aggregation website GameRankings. IGN said, "When you actually put the character into the game, controls are pretty tight and solid", and concluded, "Fighter Maker is one of the most unique software packages on the PlayStation. I'm guessing we're going to see a ton of websites dedicated to characters gamers have created, uploaded with the handy-dandy DexDrive. The competition between friends is going to be fierce. Who can create the coolest, most utilitarian character in the game?" GameRevolution gave it a mixed review, a few weeks before the game was released Stateside. In Japan, Famitsu gave it a score of 25 out of 40.

Fighter Maker 2

Fighter Maker 2 (FM2) for the PS2 was another entry in the Designer Series from Agetec Inc. It is similar to the original, but with more advancements in character design, movement, and attacks.

Reception

Fighter Maker 2 received more mixed reviews than the original according to the review aggregation website Metacritic.

2D series

2D Fighter Maker 95
2D Fighter Maker 95 (FM95) was released for Windows prior to ASCII's departure from gaming.  Unlike its PlayStation counterparts, this version focused on 2D-style gameplay, allowing the user to create and import their own characters, sounds and graphics into the engine, allowing for far more flexibility and range than the PS versions.  The program was pirated and fan translated to English and released on the Internet, where it found a large following amongst dojin game makers and the M.U.G.E.N. community.

2D Fighter Maker 2nd
2D Fighter Maker 2nd (FM2K) was released by ASCII's successor company, Enterbrain.  An update to the original version, FM2K allowed for a greater amount of expansion and extension than FM95, revising much of the original engine to allow more options while adding a menu-based system for clarity.  As with the previous version, it became wildly popular amongst the dojin communities in Japan.  Again, piracy and a fan translation followed, though the second version has yet to meet with the success of the first, primarily due to the large amount of M.U.G.E.N. communities already in operation as well as the incomplete translation of the FM2K software and documentation. In August 2022, WindowsLogic Productions released a completely re-translated copy of the 2D Fighter Maker 2nd. software, fixing many of the issues of the original translation.

See also 
 Enterbrain's other game creation suites:
RPG Maker
Sim RPG Maker
Beats of Rage
M.U.G.E.N

References

1998 video games
PlayStation (console) games
Kadokawa Dwango franchises
Fighting games
Video game development software
Windows games
Video games with user-generated gameplay content